Zhou Kanfei (born 16 October 1990) is a Chinese Paralympic swimmer from Kunming, China. At the 2020 Summer Paralympics, she won a silver medal in the 50 metre backstroke S4 and the 150 metre individual medley SM4. Her younger sister, Zhou Ying, is also a para swimmer; she won a bronze medal at the 2010 IPC Swimming World Championships in the 200m freestyle S5.

References 

1990 births
Living people
Paralympic silver medalists for China
Paralympic swimmers of China
Chinese female backstroke swimmers
Swimmers at the 2020 Summer Paralympics
Medalists at the 2020 Summer Paralympics
S4-classified Paralympic swimmers
Paralympic medalists in swimming
Sportspeople from Kunming
Chinese female medley swimmers
21st-century Chinese women